Jim Hickey Jr. (born November 13, 1940) is an American bobsledder. He competed in the four man event at the 1972 Winter Olympics.

References

1940 births
Living people
American male bobsledders
Olympic bobsledders of the United States
Bobsledders at the 1972 Winter Olympics
People from Keene, New York